Steinhausen, officially Steinhausen an der Rottum, is a town  from Ochsenhausen, in the Biberach district of Baden-Württemberg, Germany.

Population development

Buildings
 Baroque pilgrimage church Kirche Mariä Himmelfahrt, 1672/73
 Chapel St.-Anna-Kapelle, 1592

References

Biberach (district)
Württemberg